The Universal Gallant, or The Different Husbands is a 1735 comedy play by the British writer Henry Fielding.

The original Drury Lane cast included James Quin as Mondish, William Mills as Gaylove, Theophilus Cibber as Captain Spark, Benjamin Griffin as Sir Simon Raffler, John Harper as Colonel Raffler and Mary Heron as Mrs Raffler.

Fielding dedicated the work to Charles Spencer, 3rd Duke of Marlborough. It was not a success and met a hostile reception its opening night, and lasted for only three performances.

References

Bibliography
 Burling, William J. A Checklist of New Plays and Entertainments on the London Stage, 1700-1737. Fairleigh Dickinson Univ Press, 1992.
 Cleary, Thomas R. Henry Fielding: A Political Writer. Wilfrid Laurier Univ. Press, 2006.
 Nicoll, Allardyce. A History of Early Eighteenth Century Drama: 1700-1750. CUP Archive, 1927.

1735 plays
West End plays
Comedy plays
Plays by Henry Fielding